Brandon Johnson (born March 27, 1976) is an American educator and politician from Illinois. A member of the Democratic Party, Johnson serves on the Cook County Board of Commissioners, representing the 1st district. Johnson defeated incumbent Commissioner Richard Boykin in the Democratic primary election in March 2018; he won the general election unopposed and was reelected in 2022. In the 2023 election for mayor of Chicago, he won the second-most votes in the first round on February 28 with 21.6% and will face Paul Vallas who garnered 33% of first-round votes, in the April 4 runoff election.

Early life and education 
Johnson was born in Elgin, Illinois. He earned a bachelor's degree in human services, Youth Development Programming, and Management and a master's degree in teaching from Aurora University.

Career 
Johnson worked as a social studies teacher at Jenner Academy Elementary and George Westinghouse College Prep, both part of the Chicago Public Schools system. He became an organizer with the Chicago Teachers Union in 2011, and helped organize the 2012 Chicago teachers strike. He also helped lead field campaigns during the 2015 Chicago mayoral and aldermanic elections.

Cook County commissioner (2018–present) 
Johnson ran against incumbent Richard Boykin in the 2018 election for the Cook County Board of Commissioner's 1st district. He was endorsed by a number of labor organizations and progressive advocacy groups, including the Chicago Teachers Union, Grassroots Illinois Action, Our Revolution, and SEIU Locals 1 and 73. He was also endorsed by Cook County Board of Commissioners President Toni Preckwinkle. He won the Democratic Party primary election on March 20, 2018, defeating Boykin by 0.8 percentage points (437 votes), and ran unopposed in the general election on November 6, 2018. Johnson was sworn in as a Cook County commissioner on December 3, 2018.

He was the chief sponsor of the Just Housing Ordinance, which amended the county's housing ordinance by prohibiting potential landlords or property owners from asking about or considering prospective tenants' or homebuyers' criminal history. The ordinance was passed in April 2019. Johnson has generally been allied with County Board President Toni Preckwinkle.

In October 2019, Johnson spoke at a solidarity rally supporting striking teachers and support staff during the 2019 Chicago Public Schools Strike, and wrote supportive letters to editor in the Chicago Tribune and Chicago Sun-Times. Johnson works as a paid organizer for CTU, focusing on legislative affairs. Politico's Illinois Playbook reported after the strike that Johnson was rumored as a potential mayoral candidate in the 2023 election; Johnson responded by calling the rumors "laughable" and criticizing the publication for making a connection between the strike and his electoral career. In November 2019, Johnson wrote an essay in a CTU publication drawing a distinction between the union's organizing model and "top-down school governance."

Johnson endorsed Toni Preckwinkle ahead of the first round of the 2019 Chicago mayoral election. He also endorsed Melissa Conyears-Ervin in the 2019 Chicago city treasurer election. In August 2019, Johnson endorsed the candidacy of Elizabeth Warren in the 2020 Democratic Party presidential primaries. Johnson claimed that he came to his decision on who to endorse after having conversations with Warren and other contenders in the election, including Bernie Sanders. He praised Warren as, “the only candidate who took special interest in black progressive voices” and as, "a woman who has never let fear win."

Johnson was reelected in 2022.

2023 Chicago mayoral election

First round
As early as November 2019, there had been speculation that Johnson might run for mayor of Chicago in 2023. On September 13, 2022, Johnson launched an exploratory committee to consider running for mayor of Chicago in the 2023 election. In the weeks that followed, he received endorsements from United Working Families, the Chicago Teachers Union, and progressive independent political organizations in the 30th, 33rd, 35th, and 39th wards. On October 23, the American Federation of Teachers pledged to donate $1 million to Johnson's campaign should he enter the race. On October 27, Johnson formally announced his candidacy.

Johnson's campaign was supported by what Heather Cherone of WTTW News described as a "coalition of progressive groups". During the course of his campaign in the first round of the election, Johnson received further endorsements from several local chapters of the American Federation of Teachers (AFT), including the Chicago Teachers Union (AFT Local 1). He received further union endorsements from Service Employees International Union (SEIU) Healthcare Illinois, and SEIU Local 73. Johnson also received endorsements from the Independent Voters of Illinois-Independent Precinct Organization (IVI-IPO) and two of its ward chapters, the United Working Families and 33rd ward chapter, the Working Families Party, and Jewish Council on Urban Affairs Votes. Johnson was the beneficiary of Chuy García's decision to wait until after the 2022 United States House of Representatives election to announce his mayoral candidacy, as a number of groups that had supported García 2015 mayoral campaign, such as the Chicago Teachers Union and the United Working Families, grew impatient of waiting for a decision by García on whether he would run and instead pledged their support to Johnson. Johnson also received endorsements from Illinois U.S. Congressmen Jonathan Jackson and Delia Ramirez. Seven incumbent Chicago aldermen (City Council members), several members of the Illinois State Legislature, and several of Johnson's colleagues on the Cook Board of Commissioners also endorsed Johnson.

Johnson was described as a "progressive" and a favored "candidate of the left." His campaign emphasized funding and resources for public schools, a public safety platform that includes efficiency audits and non-police responses to mental health emergencies, support for a real estate transfer tax to fund homelessness response and prevention, and a budget that proposes raising $1 billion in new revenues including through new or increased taxes on airlines, financial transactions, high-value real estate transfers, and hotels. Amid polling showing crime and police relations as the leading issue, Johnson was the only primary candidate who did not express support for hiring more police officers, suggesting instead an increase in the detective force from existing ranks, citywide youth hiring, reopening mental health centers, and investment in violence prevention as means to address 'root causes of crime', in line with voter preferences for increased job training and economic opportunity over force expansion.

Johnson exchanged criticisms with several of his opponents. Johnson delivered focused criticisms of Mayor Lightfoot, who criticized Johnson in return. Another opponent that Johnson exchanged barbs with was Chuy García. Johnson characterized García of having "abandon[ed] the progressive movement” and of having presented no distinction from Mayor Lightfoot in his proposals for combatting violent crime in Chicago. Johnson further characterized García as having been absent from work on a number of issues that impacted Latino neighborhoods in the city. In turn, García characterized Johnson's tax proposals as being incomplete and outside of a mayor's ability to enact and questioned whether Johnson, as a former organizer for the Chicago Teachers Union, would be able to objectively negotiate with them on behalf of the city. Johnson, at a mayoral debate, attacked fellow candidate Paul Vallas, the former CEO of Chicago Public Schools, by claiming that Vallas' tenure as CEO had, "further stratified our school district, leaving our schools without the necessary support that they need." In the closing weeks of the campaign, as Johnson was recognized as a more prominent contender in the race due to a continued rise in polls, he began to face focused criticism from Mayor Lightfoot as well as fellow progressive challengers Kam Buckner and Ja'Mal Green. Until February, Lightfoot had made public remarks that were dismissive of Johnson's chances in the election. On February 8, 2023, a political action committee supporting Mayor Lightfoot began to run an attack ad against Johnson.  In the final televised debate prior to the close of the initial election, held on February 13, 2023, Johnson faced strong targeted criticism from several of his opponents, receiving particularly intense criticism from Lightfoot and Green.

By mid-February, polls indicated that Johnson was one of four candidates with clear probability of being among the first two finishers and advancing to a likely runoff election. The other three candidates who were shown by polls to be the most likely to advance were Paul Vallas, Mayor Lightfoot, and Chuy García.

In the first round of the election on February 28, Johnson placed second with about 22% of the vote and advanced to the runoff election on April 4, where he will face Paul Vallas, who placed first in the initial round of the election with over 33% of the vote.

Runoff
After they were eliminated in the election's first round as mayoral candidates, U.S Congressman Chuy García and Illinois State Senator Kam Buckner endorsed Johnson in the runoff. Johnson received several endorsements from prominent organizations and figures that had backed candidates in the first round of the election that had failed to make the runoff. Among those that had backed Lightfoot in the first round of the election who have given their endorsements to Johnson for the runoff include Equality Illinois, U.S. Congressman from Illinois Danny Davis Johnson also received the endorsement of U.S. Congresswoman from Illinois Jan Schakowsky, who had endorsed García in the election's first round. He has also gained the endorsement of an other officeholders that endorsed García in the first round of the election.

In the runoff, Johnson also gained the endorsements of the local trade union chapters American Federation of Government Employees Local 704, and Service Employees International Union Local 1. Johnson also received the endorsements of Our Revolution, the Illinois Chapter of the Sierra Club, the Chicago National Organization for Women PAC, Personal PAC, and the Illinois Nurses Association. Among the more prominent politicians who have endorsed Johnson during the runoff campaign U.S. Senators and former presidential candidates Elizabeth Warren (of Massachusetts), Bernie Sanders (of Vermont). Activist and former presidential candidate Jesse Jackson endorsed Johnson. Among other notable politicians to endorse Johnson in the runoff are Cook County Board of Commissioners President Toni Preckwinkle (who was the runner-up of the previous mayoral election in 2019) U.S. Congressman from South Carolina Jim Clyburn, and Illinois Attorney General Kwame Raoul. Also endorsing is former U.S. Senator from Illinois Carol Moseley Braun, herself a one-time presidential candidate and a one-time candidate for mayor of Chicago in 2011.

Johnson has criticized Vallas for ties to Republican Party organizations and figures, as well as his ties to conservative causes, remarking in the first runoff debate, "Chicago cannot afford Republicans like Paul Vallas". This has included bringing up 2009 remarks in which Vallas had expressed opposition to abortion rights and declared himself "more of a Republican than a Democrat." In response to this line of criticism, Vallas has proclaimed himself a "lifelong Democrat", citing his candidacy in the primary of the 2002 Illinois gubernatorial election and his unsuccessful campaign as the Democratic Party's nominee for lieutenant governor in the 2014 Illinois gubernatorial election.

Vallas has accused Johnson of lacking "substance", accusing him of lacking a significant political record.

Johnson and Vallas have both agreed on continuing expanding the INVEST South/West Initiative launched by Mayor Lightfoot, which directs investment into historically disadvantaged South and West Side neighborhoods. Vallas and Johnson have also agreed that the city should not utilize public money in order to persuade the Chicago Bears football team, which is pursuing a new stadium in the suburb of Arlington Heights, to remain in the city of Chicago. Prior to advancing to the runoff, both Johnson and Vallas had come out in opposition to the notion of the city spending $2 billion or more to renovate and build a dome over the Bears' current municipally-owned home stadium, Soldier Field. While Vallas has expressed his belief that it is a foregone matter that the Bears will not reconsider a move to Arlington Heights, in the runoff Johnson reiterated his previously-declared stance that the city should still pursue the opportunity to negotiate with the football team and has pledged that as mayor he would "sit down and work with the [Chicago Bears] ownership," in order to see what arrangement the city and the team, "can figure out."

Personal life 
Johnson lives in the Austin neighborhood on the west side of Chicago with his wife, Stacie, and their three children.

Electoral history

Cook County Board of Commissioners
2018

2022

Mayoral

Notes

References

External links
 
 

21st-century African-American politicians
21st-century American politicians
Aurora University alumni
Illinois Democrats
Living people
Members of the Cook County Board of Commissioners
People from Elgin, Illinois
Politicians from Chicago
Schoolteachers from Illinois
1976 births